is a Japanese footballer who plays as a midfielder for Japanese club Giravanz Kitakyushu.

Playing career
He started out playing for the FC Tokyo youth system, specifically the U-15 Shenzhen team. His team won the 2003 Japanese Club Youth U-15 Championship. He later attended and played for Maebashi Scholarship High School. With his help, the team made the semifinals of the 2008 All Japan High School Soccer Tournament. He scored 2 goals in 5 games and was named to the Tournament All-Star team. He also represented Japan in various U18 tournaments at this time, including the 2010 AFC U-19 Championship qualification. After graduating from high school, he refused J.League Division 1 offers in order to play for Chuo University.

Musaka captained Japan during the 2010 AFC U-19 Championship in China, scoring a goal and leading his team to the quarterfinals of the tournament, where they lost by a score of 3–2 to South Korea. He played in various other international youth tournaments, such as the Dallas Cup, the SBS Cup, the Sendai Cup and the Milk Cup.

In 2011, he was chosen to represent his country at the 2011 Summer Universiade. He scored two goals in the tournament and had an assist in the championship game, where Japan beat Britain 2–0 to win its 5th Universiade soccer title.

After his college graduation, he had offers from Shimizu S-Pulse, Omiya Ardija and Kashima Antlers, but on 1 January 2013, Musaka signed with Shimizu. He made his J.League Division 1 debut on 10 July against Kashima Antlers in a 3–1 loss, and scored his first goal as a professional against Kawasaki Frontale on 2 November 2014 in a 3–2 win.

Club statistics
Updated to 18 February 2019.

References

External links
Profile at Shimizu S-Pulse

1991 births
Living people
Chuo University alumni
Association football people from Tokyo
Japanese footballers
Japan youth international footballers
J1 League players
J2 League players
J3 League players
Shimizu S-Pulse players
Giravanz Kitakyushu players
Association football midfielders
Universiade gold medalists for Japan
Universiade medalists in football
Medalists at the 2011 Summer Universiade